Sonketa Ridge (‘Hrebet Sonketa’ \'hre-bet son-'ke-ta\ is the mostly ice-covered ridge extending 11.5 km in east-west direction and 4 km wide, rising to 1128 m at its east extremity in the west foothills of Detroit Plateau and partly on Relyovo Peninsula on Danco Coast in Graham Land, Antarctica. It is connected to the northwest slopes of Razhana Buttress to the east by Zhelad Saddle, and surmounts Sikorsky Glacier to the north and Trepetlika Glacier to the south.  Sonketa is a Thracian place name from Western Bulgaria.

Location
British mapping in 1978.

Maps
British Antarctic Territory. Scale 1:200000 topographic map. DOS 610 Series, Sheet W 64 60. Directorate of Overseas Surveys, Tolworth, UK, 1978.
 Antarctic Digital Database (ADD). Scale 1:250000 topographic map of Antarctica. Scientific Committee on Antarctic Research (SCAR). Since 1993, regularly upgraded and updated.

Notes

References
 Bulgarian Antarctic Gazetteer. Antarctic Place-names Commission. (details in Bulgarian, basic data in English)
Sonketa Ridge. SCAR Composite Gazetteer of Antarctica.

External links
 Sonketa Ridge. Copernix satellite image

Ridges of Graham Land
Bulgaria and the Antarctic
Danco Coast